The ZIL-130 is a Soviet/Russian truck produced by ZIL in Moscow, Russia. The first prototype was built in 1956. Production began in 1962, while mass production started in 1964. It was one of the most numerous cargo trucks in the USSR and Russia, in total ZIL built 3,380,000 trucks up to 1994. In 1995, production was moved to the now-defunct Ural Motor Plant (UamZ, its trucks were known as UamZ-43140).

History 
The ZiL plant started working on a replacement for the ZIL-164, right after De-Stalinization took place. The first prototype was built some months later and had a brand new cabin, as well as a wider windshield influenced by Dodge trucks.

The new model retained little from its predecessor, with a new V8 engine and a more reinforced frame, however, the newer truck was slightly shorter than the ZIL-164 truck. Mass-production started in 1964 under the ZIL-130 name, and soon the ZIL-164 was discontinued in favor of its more modern successor.

The ZIL-130 received the latest features adopted by the global car industry of the 1950s while not being based on any foreign model and having a unique chassis, cabin and other parts. In 1965 the heavier ZIL-131 truck started getting produced. 
In 1986 the company started producing the newer ZIL-4331 truck, but production of the ZIL-130 continued even after the dissolution of the Soviet Union, eventually ending in 1995, when the design tooling was sold to UamZ and production continued as the UamZ-43140 truck until 2012.

Modifications 
Over the course of production, there were two modernizations of the ZIL-130 in 1966 and 1977. After the second one the radiator enclosure was changed.

 ZIL-130 Prototype 1956
 ZIL-130 Prototype 1962
 ZIL-130-66 – modification 1966
 ZIL-130-76 – modification 1976
 ZIL-130-80 – modification 1980
 ZIL-130AN – version powered by ZIL-157 engine
 ZIL-130B2 – chassis for ZIL-MMZ-554 and ZIL-MMZ-554M
 ZIL-130D1 – ZIL-130D with single-speed rear axle for ZIL-MMZ-555 and ZIL-MMZ-4502
 ZIL-133D1E – chassis for ZIL-MMZ-555E, export version for temperate climates
 ZIL-130D1T – chassis for ZIL-MMZ-555T, export version for tropical climates
 ZIL-130D1Sh
 ZIL-130D2 – dump/tractor version for ZIL-MMZ-555A and ZIL-MMZ-45022
 ZIL-130D3 – chassis for dump truck
 ZIL-130E (1965) – export version for temperate climates
 ZIL-130Е (1967) – version with shielded electrics
 ZIL-130EE – export version with shielded electrics for temperate climates
 ZIL-130ET – export version with shielded electrics for tropical climates
 ZIL-130G – long wheelbase version
 ZIL-130GE (1965) – export long wheelbase version for temperate climates
 ZIL-130GE (1967) – long wheelbase version with shielded electrics
 ZIL-130GET – export long wheelbase version with shielded electrics for tropical and temperate climates
 ZIL-130GS – long wheelbase version for northern climates
 ZIL-130GT – export long wheelbase version for tropical climates
 ZIL-130G1
 ZIL-130G1-76
 ZIL-130GU – extra long-wheelbase version, based on the ZIL-133G1
 ZIL-130GU-76
 ZIL-130K – cab-chassis version powered by ZIL-157D engine for ZIL-MMK-555K and ZIL-MMZ-45021 dump trucks
 ZIL-130KSh
 ZIL-130N — tractor-trailer version
 ZIL-130S — variant for northern climates
 ZIL-130S-76
 ZIL-130Sh
 ZIL-130T – export variant for tropical climates
 ZIL-MMZ-130P
 ZIL-MMZ-130S
 ZIL-130V1 – tractor-trailer version
 ZIL-130V1-76 — modification 1976
 ZIL-130V1E (1965) – export tractor-trailer version for temperate climates
 ZIL-130V1E (1967) – tractor-trailer version with shielded electrics
 ZIL-130V1T – export tractor-trailer version for tropical climates
 ZIL-136I — diesel engine version for export, powered by a Perkins 6.345 engine
 ZIL-136IG – long wheelbase diesel engine version for export, powered by a Perkins 6.345 engine
 ZIL-136IDI – export diesel engine version for dump truck, powered by a Perkins 6.345 engine
 ZIL-138 — version powered by LPG
 ZIL-138D2 – LPG powered version for MMZ-ZIL-45023
 ZIL-138V1 – tractor-trailer version powered by LPG
 ZIL-138A – dual-fuel (CNG and A-76 gasoline) version
 ZIL-138AG – dual-fuel, long wheelbase version
 ZIL-138I – dual-fuel (CNG and Al-93 gasoline) version
 ZIL-138IG – dual-fuel, long wheelbase version
 ZIL-133 — three-axle version

Prototype modifications
 ZIL5000A – prototype version with a two-speed rear axle and trailer towing equipment
 ZIL-130AU – ZIL-130A with reinforced frame and suspension
 ZIL-130A1 – prototype version with single-speed rear axle and trailer towing equipment
 ZIL-130B – prototype cab-chassis for agricultural dump truck
 ZIL-130D – prototype cab-chassis with two-speed rear axle (for industrial dump truck)
 ZIL-130F — prototype version powered by a ZIL-130F engine
 ZIL-130GU – prototype long wheelbase version with reinforced frame and suspension
 ZIL-130L — prototype version powered by a ZIL-120VK I6 engine with trailer towing equipment removed
 ZIL-130GL – prototype long wheelbase version powered by a ZIL-120VK I6 engine with trailer towing equipment removed
 ZIL-130VL – prototype tractor-trailer version powered by a ZIL-120VK I6 engine
 ZIL-130M — prototype version powered by a ZMZ-41 V8 engine with trailer towing equipment removed
 ZIL-130GM – prototype long wheelbase version powered ay a ZMZ-41 V8 engine with trailer towing equipment removed
 ZIL-130N – prototype version with hydraulic system with pump and PTO (for MMZ-812 grain trailer)
 ZIL-130V – prototype tractor-trailer version with a two-speed rear axle
 ZIL-130VT – prototype tractor-trailer version with reinforced two-speed rear axle
 ZIL-130V1S – prototype tractor-trailer version for northern regions; produced in a small series
 ZIL-130V2 – prototype tractor-trailer version with  wheelbase
 ZIL-E130 – prototype version with aluminum frame
 ZIL-136 – prototype diesel version
 ZIL-E138AV – prototype version powered by compressed gas
 ZIL-138AB – prototype dual-fuel (CNG and A-76 gasoline) version with trailer towing equipment (for ZIL-MMZ-45054); later redesignated as ZIL-496110 and entered production in 1987
 ZIL-138IB – prototype dual-fuel (CNG and Al-93 gasoline) version with trailer towing equipment (for ZIL-MMZ-45054)
 ZIL-175 — prototype with lifting axle

Since 1986, in accordance with the branch standard OST 37.001-269-83, the ZIL-130 series received new indexes: ZIL-431410 (ZIL-130), ZIL-431510 (ZIL-130Г), ZIL-441510 (ZIL-130В1), ZIL-431810 (ZIL-138), ZIL-431610 (ZIL-138А), etc.

References

External links

130
Trucks of the Soviet Union
Cars of Russia